Lake Dulverton is a  shallow lake or sandstone lagoon located adjacent to the town of Oatlands in the Southern Midlands region of Tasmania, Australia.

The lake has an uneven shoreline with many low sandstone cliffs and overhangs. The lake dried up in 1993 and remained dry for years until heavy rains in August 2010, filled the lake to near full supply level. During this dry period, two levees were built across the lake dividing it into three sections. Only the smallest section near the Callington Mill was able to remain full.

The floor of the lake is composed of peaty soils, rock and sand. When full, the waters of the lake quickly fill with pondweed and numerous waterbirds. The lake forms part of a wildlife sanctuary.

See also

List of reservoirs and dams in Tasmania
List of lakes in Tasmania

References 

Midlands (Tasmania)
Dulverton